St James's Park is a  park in the City of Westminster, central London. It is at the southernmost tip of the St James's area, which was named after a leper hospital dedicated to St James the Less. It is the most easterly of a near-continuous chain of parks that includes (moving westward) Green Park, Hyde Park, and Kensington Gardens.

The park is bounded by Buckingham Palace to the west, the Mall to the north, Horse Guards to the east, and Birdcage Walk to the south. It meets Green Park at Queen's Gardens with the Victoria Memorial at its centre, opposite the entrance to Buckingham Palace. St James's Palace is on the opposite side of The Mall. The closest London Underground stations are St James's Park, Green Park, Victoria, and Westminster.

The park is Grade I listed on the Register of Historic Parks and Gardens.

Features

The park has a small lake, St James's Park Lake, with two islands, West Island and Duck Island, the latter named for the lake's collection of waterfowl. At the end of the nineteenth century Duck Island was considered a sufficiently remote location for Scotland Yard to establish a bomb disposal facility there; the resident bird-keeper was given the responsibility of looking  after the implements kept for dismantling the devices. It now houses pumps and water treatment machinery for the lake and fountains.

A resident colony of pelicans has been a feature of the park since a Russian ambassador donated them to Charles II in 1664. While most of the birds' wings are clipped, there is a pelican which can be seen flying, occasionally beyond the confines of the Park.

The Blue Bridge across the lake affords a tree-framed view west towards Buckingham Palace. Looking east, the view includes the Swire Fountain to the north of Duck Island and, past the lake, the grounds of Horse Guards Parade, with Horse Guards, the Old War Office and Whitehall Court behind. To the south of Duck Island is the Tiffany Fountain on Pelican Rock; and past the lake is the Foreign and Commonwealth Office, with the London Eye, the Shell Tower, and the Shard behind. The park has a children's playground including a large sandpit.

History 
In 1532, Henry VIII purchased from Eton College an area of marshland through which the Tyburn flowed. It lay to the west of York Place acquired by Henry from Cardinal Wolsey; it was purchased in order to turn York Place, subsequently renamed Whitehall, into a dwelling fit for a king. On James I's accession to the throne in 1603, he ordered that the park be drained and landscaped, and exotic animals were kept in the park, including camels, crocodiles, an elephant and exotic birds, kept in aviaries.

While Charles II was in exile in France under the Commonwealth of England, he was impressed by the elaborate gardens at French royal palaces, and on his ascension he had the park redesigned in a more formal style, probably by the French landscaper André Mollet. A 775-metre by 38-metre (850 by 42-yard) ornamental canal was created as evidenced in the old plan. The king opened the park to the public and used the area to entertain guests and mistresses, such as Nell Gwyn. The park became notorious at the time as a meeting place for impromptu acts of lechery, as described by John Wilmot, 2nd Earl of Rochester in his poem "A Ramble in St James's Park".

In the late 17th and early 18th centuries cows grazed on the park, and milk could be bought fresh at the "Lactarian", described by Zacharias Conrad von Uffenbach in 1710. The 18th century saw further changes, including the reclamation of part of the canal for Horse Guards Parade and the purchase of Buckingham House (now Buckingham Palace) at the west end of the Mall, for the use of Queen Charlotte in 1761.

Further remodelling in 1826–27, commissioned by the Prince Regent (later George IV) and overseen by the architect and landscaper John Nash, saw the canal's conversion into a more naturally-shaped lake, and formal avenues rerouted to romantic winding pathways. At the same time, Buckingham House was expanded to create the palace, and Marble Arch was built at its entrance, whilst The Mall was turned into a grand processional route. It opened to public traffic 60 years later in 1887. The Marble Arch was moved to its current location at the junction of Oxford Street and Park Lane in 1851 and the Victoria Memorial was erected between 1906 and 1934.

Gallery

References

External links 
 
 Visitor information at the Royal Parks website

Parks and open spaces in the City of Westminster
Royal Parks of London
1603 establishments in England
Grade I listed parks and gardens in London
Urban public parks in the United Kingdom